Catherine M. Stearns is an American poet.

Biography
Stearns earned her B.A. from Beloit College and her M.F.A. in Poetry from the Iowa Writers’ Workshop, where she studied with Donald Justice, Larry Levis, and Jane Cooper. She earned a Ph.D. in English and American Literature from Brandeis University, where her thesis advisor was the poet Allen Grossman.

Stearns began a long teaching career at the College of St. Catherine in St. Paul, Minnesota. She chaired the English Department at Belmont Hill School, an independent school in Belmont, Massachusetts, and in 2014 was named Writer in Residence at The Roxbury Latin School in Boston. In 2008, as a Preceptor in Harvard’s Writing Program, she received a Certificate of Excellence and Distinction in Teaching from the Derek Bok Center.  She lives in South Natick, Massachusetts, with her husband Richard Klug, a film director and cinematographer.

Her first book, The Transparency of Skin (New Rivers Press, 1988), was a Minnesota Voices Project Winner and a finalist for the Minnesota Book Awards. Her chapbook Then & Again, winner of the Elyse Wolf Prize, was published by Slate Roof Press in 2018.

Her poems have been published in literary journals including The Yale Review, Southwest Review, Salamander, The New Ohio Review, and North American Review. Her poems have been featured on Poetry Daily and in American Life in Poetry. Her work has been anthologized in a collection of British and American Poetry and in The House on Via Gambito, writing by American Women Abroad.

Awards and honors
Her honors include grants and awards from the Iowa Arts Council, the Loft-McKnight Foundation, the Dana Award, and the Massachusetts Cultural Council.

Works
Then & Again.  Slate Roof Press. February 2018.

Anthologies

References

External links
https://slateroofpress.tumblr.com/post/189331918120/shape-shifting-memory-susan-glass-interviews

American women poets
Beloit College alumni
Brandeis University alumni
Poets from Massachusetts
Poets from Illinois
Living people
People from Champaign, Illinois
Roxbury Latin School faculty
Year of birth missing (living people)